Hartlepool railway station was a railway station that served the Headland area of Hartlepool in the ceremonial county of Durham, North East England. Though originally built as the coastal terminus of the Hartlepool Dock & Railway in 1839, for most of its life the station was the terminus of a shuttle service from the town's main station in West Hartlepool.

History 
Though the first mineral train along the HD&R reached Hartlepool on 1 January 1835, the first passenger station in Hartlepool was not opened until 1839. Facilities at this first station were initially housed in the hull of a grounded ship before a more permanent building was provided, close to Commercial Street. From 1845, the HD&R leased the Great North of England, Clarence & Hartlepool Junction Railway which had opened a line from a junction with the HD&R at Wingate to  six years earlier. However just a year after the HD&R leased the GNEC&HJR, both companies were leased by the newly formed York & Newcastle Railway, before being amalgamated into its successor, the York, Newcastle & Berwick Railway, on 22 July 1848. Passengers from Hartlepool were first carried over the GNEC&HJR in 1846.

The York, Newcastle & Berwick Railway was amalgamated with other companies to form the North Eastern Railway in 1854 and in 1877 the NER constructed a line linking the former HD&R directly to the former Stockton & Hartlepool Railway in West Hartlepool. As part of the rationalisation of the rail network around Hartlepool, the NER opened a new terminus at Hartlepool, west of the original station, on 16 November 1878 and a new through station at West Hartlepool two years later. Following the opening of the new station, the original one was converted into a goods shed. The growth of West Hartlepool, combined with the decline of "old" Hartlepool led to the diversion of passenger services from the former HD&R and GNEC&HJR lines into West Hartlepool station, leaving Hartlepool as the terminus of a shuttle service between the two towns.

The opening of a parallel steam tramway in 1884, and its later conversion to electric traction in 1899, introduced direct competition to this shuttle service. Hoping to emulate the success of the then recently launched Tyneside Electrics system, the NER first launched their experimental petrol electric autocars on the Hartlepool-West Hartlepool shuttle service in August 1904, hoping that they could provide a frequent (10-minute frequency) 5-minute journey time service capable of drawing back passengers from the tramway. However, only one unit actually saw service on this route and, after further trials on the Port Clarence Branch in early 1905, this unit was transferred to  later that year. Nonetheless, even after the NER became part of the London and North Eastern Railway in the 1923 grouping, the shuttle continued to attempt to compete with trams and busses. In 1925, the LNER shuttle service consisted of 49 trains per day but by 1939 it had declined to 38, with services then normally operated by LNER Sentinel steam railcars.

However, wartime economy measures led to this service being reduced to just four trains each way from 2 October 1939, a service level which was maintained until public passenger services were withdrawn on 16 June 1947. Even so, the station still continued to handle services for school children until 23 March 1964.

References

External links 

Disused railway stations in the Borough of Hartlepool
Former North Eastern Railway (UK) stations
Railway stations in Great Britain opened in 1839
Railway stations in Great Britain closed in 1947